Muhammad Reza Arya Pratama (born 18 May 2000) is an Indonesian professional footballer who plays as a goalkeeper for Liga 1 club PSM Makassar.

Club career

PSM Makassar
Reza was part of the PSM Makassar youth team from 2017 to 2019, earning a spot on the senior team ahead of the 2019 Liga 1 season.

Reza made his league debut on 23 July 2022 against PSS Sleman. Six days later, he kept his first clean sheet in a 2–0 victory over Bali United.

Career statistics

Club

Notes

References

External links
 Reza Arya Pratama at Soccerway
 Reza Arya Pratama at Liga Indonesia

2000 births
Living people
People from Parepare
Sportspeople from South Sulawesi
Indonesian footballers
Liga 1 (Indonesia) players
PSM Makassar players
Association football goalkeepers